Abiward or Abi-ward, was an ancient Sassanid city in modern-day Turkmenistan. Archaeological excavations at the ancient city of Abiward have been made in the last century about 8 km west of Kaka in an area of 12,000 m2. The central tell is 60 feet high and 700 feet round.

References

External links
 ABĪVARD: a town in medieval northern Khorasan

Archaeological sites in Turkmenistan
Sasanian cities
Nishapur Quarter
Ahal Region